Ram Nath Kovind (born 1 October 1945) is an Indian politician and lawyer who served as the 14th president of India from 2017 to 2022. He is a member of the Bharatiya Janata Party. He is the second person after K. R. Narayanan, from the Dalit community to occupy the post. Prior to his presidency, he served as the 26th Governor of Bihar from 2015 to 2017.He is also served as a Member of Rajya Sabha from 1994 to 2006. Before entering politics, he was a lawyer for 16 years and practiced in the Delhi High Court and the Supreme Court of India until 1993.

Early life and education 
Ram Nath Kovind was born in the Koli family of Maiku Lal and Kalawati during the British Raj on 1 October 1945, in Paraunkh village in the Kanpur Dehat district of Uttar Pradesh, as the youngest of five brothers and two sisters. His father Maikulal ran a shop and was also a farmer and a local vaidya. His mother Kalawati was a homemaker. Kovind was born in a mud hut, which eventually collapsed. He was only five when his mother died of burns when their thatched dwelling caught fire. Kovind later donated the land to the community.

He holds a bachelor's degree in commerce and an LLB from DAV College (affiliated with Kanpur University).

Early career

Advocate 
After graduating in law from DAV College, Kanpur, Kovind went to Delhi to prepare for the civil services examination. He passed this exam on his third attempt, He scored high enough to work in an allied service rather than in IAS and thus started practising law.

Kovind enrolled as an advocate in 1971 with the bar council of Delhi. He was Central Government Advocate in the Delhi High Court from 1977 to 1979. Between 1977 and 1978, he also served as the personal assistant of Prime Minister of India Morarji Desai. In 1978, he became an advocate-on-record of the Supreme Court of India and served as a standing counsel for the central government in the Supreme Court of India from 1980 to 1993. He practised in the Delhi High Court and Supreme Court until 1993. As an advocate, he provided pro-bono aid to weaker sections of society, women and the poor under the Free Legal Aid Society of New Delhi.

Start of political career 
He joined the Bhartiya Janata Party (BJP) in 1991. He was the president of the BJP Dalit Morcha between 1998 and 2002 and the president of the All-India Koli Samaj. He also served as the national spokesperson of the party. He donated his ancestral home in Paraunkh to the Rashtriya Swayamsevak Sangh. Soon after joining the BJP, he contested Ghatampur assembly constituency, but lost and later contested Bhognipur in 2007 elections (both in Uttar Pradesh) assembly constituency on the BJP ticket but lost again.

In 1997, Kovind, being from koli family, joined the protest against certain orders from the central government that had adverse effects on the SC/ST workers. Later, three amendments were made to the Constitution that revoked the orders, by the NDA government headed by Atal Bihari Vajpayee.

Rajya Sabha 
He was elected and became a Rajya Sabha MP from the state of Uttar Pradesh in April 1994. He served a total of twelve years, two consecutive terms, until March 2006. As a member of parliament, he served on the Parliamentary Committee for Welfare of Scheduled Castes/Tribes, Home Affairs, Petroleum and Natural Gas, Social Justice and Empowerment, Law and Justice. He also served as the chairman of the Rajya Sabha House Committee. During his career as a parliamentarian, under the Members of Parliament Local Area Development Scheme, he focused on education in rural areas by helping in the construction of school buildings in Uttar Pradesh and Uttarakhand. As a member of parliament, he visited Thailand, Nepal, Pakistan, Singapore, Germany, Switzerland, France, the United Kingdom, and the United States on study tours.

Other appointments 
He has served on the Board of management of Dr. B.R Ambedkar University, Lucknow, and on the Board of Governors of IIM Calcutta. He has also represented India at the UN and addressed the United Nations General Assembly in October 2002.

Governor of Bihar (2015–2017) 
On 8 August 2015, President  Pranab Mukherjee appointed Kovind as the governor of Bihar. On 16 August 2015, the acting Chief Justice of Patna High Court, Iqbal Ahmad Ansari, administered the oath to Kovind as the 26th governor of Bihar, in a ceremony at Raj Bhawan in Patna.

Kovind's appointment was criticised by then Chief Minister of Bihar Nitish Kumar as it came months before 2015 state Assembly elections and the appointment was made without consulting the state government as recommended by Sarkaria Commission. However, Kovind's term as the governor was praised for constituting a judicial commission to investigate irregularities in promotion of undeserving teachers, mismanagement of funds and appointment of undeserving candidates in universities. In June 2017, when he was announced as a candidate for presidential election, Nitish Kumar backed his choice and praised him as being unbiased and working closely with the state government during his governorship.

Presidential election 

After nomination for the post of 14th president of India, he resigned from his post as the governor of Bihar, and the President of India, Pranab Mukherjee, accepted his resignation on 20 June 2017. He won the election on 20 July 2017.

Kovind received 65.65% of the valid votes, against former Speaker of the Lok Sabha, Meira Kumar, the presidential candidate of the Opposition who received 34.35%. Kovind received 2,930 votes (From MPs and MLAs) amounting to Electoral College votes of 702,044 (65.65%) as compared to 1,844 votes with a value of 367,314 (34.35%) votes for Meira Kumar lagging far behind with 367,314 votes, and 77 votes were invalid. He became only the second Dalit representative to become president after K. R. Narayanan, and also is the first BJP candidate with RSS background to be elected to the post. The tally of votes (367,314) polled by Meira Kumar is only the second-highest for a losing candidate, that of Neelam Sanjiva Reddy in the 1969 presidential elections being the highest ever; he received 405,427 votes as against 420,077 by V. V. Giri, the winner.

Presidency (2017–2022) 

Kovind took the oath as the 14th president of India on 25 July 2017. He was succeeded by Droupadi Murmu on 25 July 2022.

Personal life 

Kovind married Savita on 30 May 1974. They have a son, Prashant Kumar, and a daughter, Swati who is an air hostess for Air India.

Politicial positions
In 2010, he was reported to have said that "Islam and Christianity are alien to the nation" as spokesperson of the BJP. As reported by IANS and published by Hindustan Times, he made this comment in response to the Ranganath Misra Commission which recommended 15 percent reservation for religious and linguistic minorities in government jobs. Although more recently, the issue was raised in the media if whether or not he was misquoted and that he in fact said "Islam and Christianity are alien to the notion (of caste)" as opposed to what was reported as 'nation'.

Criticisms 
Kovind has been criticized to maintain silence in the face of crimes against his own Dalit community
and to support the government over the CAA protests, farmer agitation and the removal or abrogation of Article 370.

State honours

See also 
 Presidency of Ram Nath Kovind
 President of India

References

External links 
 

|-

|-

|-

1945 births
20th-century Indian lawyers
21st-century Indian politicians
Bharatiya Janata Party politicians from Uttar Pradesh
Candidates for President of India
Chhatrapati Shahu Ji Maharaj University alumni
Governors of Bihar
Living people
People from Kanpur Dehat district
Presidents of India
Rajya Sabha members from Uttar Pradesh
Koli people
Supreme Court of India lawyers
Recipients of orders, decorations, and medals of Madagascar